The brown parisoma or brown warbler (Curruca lugens) is a typical warbler found in eastern Africa.

References

Curruca
Birds of East Africa
Birds described in 1840